The following events occurred in April 1903:

April 1, 1903 (Wednesday)
The Midwives Act 1902 comes into effect in the UK, requiring midwives to be certified and penalizing any woman practising midwifery without certification.
Died: Elliott Zborowski (born William Elliott Morris Zborowski), American racing driver, race crash (b. 1856)

April 2, 1903 (Thursday)
Composer Pietro Mascagni leaves New York City after completing a tour of the United States.

April 3, 1903 (Friday)
Born: Kamaladevi Chattopadhyay, Indian social reformer and freedom fighter (died 1988); Peter Huchel, German poet, in Lichterfelde, under the name Hellmut Huchel (died 1981)

April 4, 1903 (Saturday)
In the UK, the Welshpool and Llanfair Light Railway and the Wrexham and District Electric Tramways both become operational.
Democrat John Nelson Hinkle is defeated by Republican Robert H. Jeffrey in the election for Mayor of Columbus, Ohio.
Scotland defeat England in the final match of the British Home Championship football tournament, resulting in a three-way tie for first place in the competition.

April 5, 1903 (Sunday)
French composer Gabriel Fauré is invested as an officer of the Légion d'honneur.

April 6, 1903 (Monday)

April 7, 1903 (Tuesday)
In Florida, United States, the Apalachicola Northern Railroad (later AN Railway) obtains its charter.

April 8, 1903 (Wednesday)
At the Camborne by-election in the UK, caused by the death of sitting Liberal MP William Sproston Caine, the seat is retained for the Liberals by 74-year-old Wilfrid Lawson. 
1903 Copa del Rey Final: Athletic Bilbao defeat Madrid CF 3-2 at the Estadio del Hipódromo in Madrid, to win Spain's football cup.

April 9, 1903 (Thursday)
William Propsting becomes Premier of Tasmania.
Three men are killed when a  gun in the forward turret of the battleship USS Iowa shatters during firing practice.

April 10, 1903 (Friday)
US tycoon Joseph Pulitzer donates $2 million to Columbia University, to found a school of journalism, also making allowance for literary prizes.

April 11, 1903 (Saturday)
The 8th Paris–Roubaix cycle race is won by Hippolyte Aucouturier.
Died: Gemma Galgani, 25, Italian mystic and Catholic saint (tuberculosis)

April 12, 1903 (Sunday)
A partial lunar eclipse takes place.
Born: Jan Tinbergen, Dutch economist and Nobel laureate, in The Hague (died 1994)

April 13, 1903 (Monday)
Died: Moritz Lazarus, 78, German philosopher

April 14, 1903 (Tuesday)
Aberdeen Football Club is founded, in Scotland.
Two workers are killed and two injured by a delayed explosion of dynamite during construction of the Mount Washington Transit Tunnel in Pittsburgh, Pennsylvania.

April 15, 1903 (Wednesday)

April 16, 1903 (Thursday)

April 17, 1903 (Friday)

April 18, 1903 (Saturday)
In the UK, the 1903 FA Cup Final is won by Bury F.C., who defeat Derby County F.C. 6-0 at Crystal Palace.

April 19, 1903 (Sunday)
The first of the Kishinev pogroms takes place in Kishinev, capital of the Bessarabia Governorate of the Russian Empire. At least 47 Jews are killed and a further 92 are seriously injured during two days of rioting, led by priests and encouraged by the press.
Born: Eliot Ness, US law enforcement agent, in Chicago (died 1957, heart attack)

April 20, 1903 (Monday)
John Aitken is elected unopposed as Mayor of Wellington, New Zealand.

April 21, 1903 (Tuesday)
The Norwegian steamer Freia is wrecked near Scharhörn during a passage from Kristiania to Harlingen, Friesland, Netherlands.

April 22, 1903 (Wednesday)
The New York Stock Exchange opens its new building in Broad Street, New York City, United States.

April 23, 1903 (Thursday)
The UK's Chancellor of the Exchequer, Charles Thomson Ritchie, announces the repeal of Corn Duty, to come into force on 1 July 1903.

April 24, 1903 (Friday)
Born: José Antonio Primo de Rivera, Spanish politician, in Madrid (died 1936)

April 25, 1903 (Saturday)
In the UK, the final of the rugby league Challenge Cup takes place at Headingley Stadium in Leeds, and is won by Halifax, who defeat Salford 7-0.
Born: Andrey Kolmogorov, Russian mathematician, in Tambov (died 1987)

April 26, 1903 (Sunday)
The Spanish football club Atlético Madrid is officially founded.
The first round of voting takes place in the Spanish general election.
The 12th season of league football in Argentina begins, with six teams competing.

April 27, 1903 (Monday)
The Jamaica Race Course opens in Jamaica, Queens, New York City, United States. The Excelsior Handicap is run for the first time as part of the opening celebrations.

April 28, 1903 (Tuesday)
1903 Manzikert earthquake: An earthquake with a magnitude of 7.0 strikes Manzikert in eastern Turkey. Approximately 3,500 people and 20,000 animals are killed.

April 29, 1903 (Wednesday)
Frank Slide: The mining town of Frank, North-West Territories, Canada, is devastated by a rockslide caused by limestone breaking off the summit of Turtle Mountain. About 70–90 people are killed, mostly buried alive.

April 30, 1903 (Thursday)

References

1903
1903-04
1903-04